Cascata da Ribeira Grande is a waterfall in Fajãzinha in the Azores of Portugal. It is described as a "towering jet of water that divides into smaller waterfalls before collecting in a still pool".

References

See also
The 6 Best Azores Waterfalls on QuestTraveAdventures

Waterfalls of the Azores